Barrow-in-Furness is a local government district with borough status in Cumbria, England. It is named after its main town, Barrow-in-Furness. Other settlements include Dalton-in-Furness and Askam-in-Furness. It is the smallest district in the county, but is the most densely populated, with 924 people per square kilometre. The population was 71,980 in 2001, reducing to 69,087 at the 2011 Census.

In July 2021 the Ministry of Housing, Communities and Local Government announced that in April 2023, Cumbria will be reorganised into two unitary authorities.  Barrow-in-Furness Borough Council is to be abolished and its functions transferred to a new authority, to be known as Westmorland and Furness, which will cover the current districts of Barrow-in-Furness, Eden and South Lakeland.

In April 2022 Gareth Davies became the first person to run every single street in the Borough of Barrow-In-Furness. Covering all 1,026 streets over an end to end distance of 201 miles.

Background
The area covered by the district is at the edge of the Furness peninsula. It jolts into the Irish Sea, being north of Morecambe Bay and south of the Duddon Estuary. The current borough was formed on 1 April 1974 by the merger of the former county borough of Barrow-in-Furness and the Dalton-in-Furness urban district from the administrative county of Lancashire. Despite being one of England's smallest local authorities it has a coastline of 63 km and has equally diverse built and natural environments. This includes 274 Listed buildings and four SSSIs, ranking as the seventh highest concentration of 325 districts on the English Heritage Index.

Barrow Borough Council

Barrow-in-Furness Borough Council sits at the Town Hall in Barrow. It is led by a mayor, who is elected by council members. In 2006, the Council was fined £125,000 for violation of health and safety laws that led to the deaths of seven people in the United Kingdom's worst outbreak of Legionnaires' disease. The council also became the UK's first public body to be charged with corporate manslaughter, but was found not guilty.

Following boundary changes in 2008, the council is composed of 36 seats, elected across 13 wards. From 2011 the council has switched from the previous system of elections occurring over a four-year cycle, with a third of seats elected each year and one 'fallow' year, to one where full council elections occur every four years.

Since its inception in 1973, the council has often been under Labour control, most recently from the 2011 election, but with three years of Conservative control (1976–1979) and ten years of no overall control (most recently from 2006 to 2011).

Current Composition
As of 2021

Council wards 
The Borough of Barrow-in-Furness comprises thirteen electoral wards, all of which can be seen on the map below.

Freedom of the Borough
The following people and military units have received the Freedom of the Borough of Barrow-in-Furness.

Individuals
 Margaret Burrow : 25 September 2022.

Military Units
 The Royal Navy Submarine Service: 11 June 2001.

References

 
Non-metropolitan districts of Cumbria
Furness
1974 establishments in England
Boroughs in England